Sixth Street Academy  is public alternative school located in Tifton, Georgia, United States.

References

External links
 
 Tift County Public Schools
  Tift County Touchdown Club

Public high schools in Georgia (U.S. state)
Schools in Tift County, Georgia
Tift County Schools
Alternative schools in the United States